Tiruvuru revenue division is an administrative division in the NTR district of the Indian state of Andhra Pradesh. It is one of the 3 revenue divisions in the district with 5 mandals under its administration and is formed on 4 April 2022 as part of a reorganisation of districts in the state.
Tiruvuru serves as the headquarters of the division.

Mandalas 
The mandalas in the division are
Reddigudem mandal,
Tiruvuru mandal
Vissannapeta mandal 
Gampalagudem mandal
A. Konduru mandal

References

Revenue divisions in NTR district